Ranchi Diaries  (2017) is a Hindi film directed by the Sattwik Mohanty. The film has been produced by Anupam Kher and Rashmin Majithia. The cast includes Himansh Kohli, Taaha Shah, Soundarya Sharma, Jimmy Shergill, Satish Kaushik, Anupam Kher and Pitobash Tripathy.

Plot
The film depicts the story of Gudiya who hails from Ranchi. She has a dream of becoming a popular pop sensation. Due to unwanted attention from local politico Thakur Bhaiya, she fled with his childhood friend Manish. Eventually Gudiya and her gang attempt robbery in local bank which goes terribly wrong.

Cast
Himansh Kohli as Manish
Taaha Shah as Pinku
Soundarya Sharma as Gudiya
Jimmy Shergill as Serious Cop
Satish Kaushik as Corrupt Cop 
Anupam Kher as Thakur Bhaiya
Pitobash Tripathy as Pradeep Kumar

Soundtrack 

The soundtrack was composed by Jeet Gannguli, Nickk, Tony Kakkar, Bobby–Imran and lyrics were by Nickk, Manoj Muntashir, Tony Kakkar, Sattwik Mohanty. Singers include Raahi, Rap: Nickk, Arijit Singh, Palak Muchhal, Tony Kakkar, Neha Kakkar, Mika Singh.

References

External links

2010s Hindi-language films
Films scored by Jeet Ganguly
Films scored by Tony Kakkar
Films shot in Jharkhand
Films set in Jharkhand